Gerry Garvan is a former Irish footballer and coach who played as a midfielder for several clubs, during the 1960s and 1970s, in the League of Ireland, including Drumcondra, Shelbourne and Athlone Town.

Club career
On 19 November 1967, while playing for Shelbourne against  Bohemians at Dalymount Park, Garvan helped Jimmy O'Connor score the fastest hat-trick in top division domestic football history. Garvan provided the cross which allowed O'Connor to head home his third goal in the space of 2 minutes and 13 seconds. He also had a hand in both other goals that created world history to this day.

Family
When Garvan married his wife Mary Martin, he married into a notable Irish footballing family. His father-in-law, Con Martin, was an international during the 1940s and 1950s and captained both Ireland teams – the FAI XI and the IFA XI. Garvan subsequently worked as an insurance broker and formed a company, Martin & Garvan Insurances Ltd. His brother-in-law Mick Martin  played for both the Republic of Ireland and Manchester United while his son, Owen Garvan, currently plays for Crystal Palace F.C.

Coaching career
As a coach Garvan found success with the junior teams of Home Farm in the Dublin and District Schoolboy League. Under  Garvan, the U-14 team, which featured his own son, Owen, went unbeaten for three years between 1999 and 2002. Along the way they won the Schoolboys FAI Cup twice.

 In 2002, Garvan took his Home Farm U-14 team to play a Celtic youth team in Glasgow and Darren O'Dea scored twice as Home Farm won 2–0.  O'Dea, Diarmuid O'Carroll, Gary Walsh and Gareth Christie were already being tracked by Celtic youth development officer, Tommy Burns, and all four were subsequently offered contracts. Three further members of Garvan's team – goalkeeper Shane Supple, defender Michael Synnott and midfielder Owen Garvan – were recruited by  Ipswich Town. Another member of the team Chris McCann signed for Burnley.

References

Living people
Businesspeople from County Dublin
Association footballers from County Dublin
Republic of Ireland association footballers
League of Ireland players
Shelbourne F.C. players
Athlone Town A.F.C. players
Home Farm F.C. coaches
Drumcondra F.C. players
Association football midfielders
Year of birth missing (living people)
Republic of Ireland football managers